Josef Buchner (born 2 March 1942 in Hagenberg im Mühlkreis) is an Austrian politician with The Greens – The Green Alternative. He was the mayor of Steyregg from 1997 to 2012. He was previously leader of the Vereinte Grüne Österreichs which merged with the Alternative Liste Österreichs in 1986 to form the current party.

References

1942 births
Living people
People from Freistadt District
Mayors of places in Austria
People from Linz-Land District
The Greens – The Green Alternative politicians